The 2010–11 Necaxa season was the 64th professional season of Mexico's top-flight football league. The season is split into two tournaments—the Torneo Apertura and the Torneo Clausura—each with identical formats and each contested by the same eighteen teams. Necaxa will begin their season on July 24, 2010 against Chiapas, Necaxa played their homes games on Fridays at 8:00pm. Necaxa was relegated to the Liga de Ascenso after having the lowest percentage of points in the 2010 Apertura and Clausura 2011 seasons.

Torneo Apertura

Squad 

 (Captain)

Out on loan

Regular season

Goalscorers

Transfers

In

Out

Results

Results summary

Results by round

Torneo Clausura

Squad

Regular season

Goalscorers

Results

Results summary

Results by round

References 

2010–11 Primera División de México season
Mexican football clubs 2010–11 season